Nationality words link to articles with information on the nation's poetry or literature (for instance, Irish or France).

Events
January 16 - Poems Descriptive of Rural Life and Scenery by "Northamptonshire peasant poet" John Clare is published in England by John Taylor
 April 22 - Walter Scott is created 1st baronet of Abbotsford in the County of Roxburgh in the Baronetage of the United Kingdom
 The Cambridge Apostles, an intellectual discussion group, is established at the University of Cambridge in England
 John Keats begins showing worse signs of tuberculosis. On the suggestion of his doctors, he leaves London for Italy with his friend Joseph Severn and moves into a house on the Spanish Steps in Rome, where his health rapidly deteriorates. He will die in 1821.
 William Wordsworth completes another major revision of The Prelude. This revision was begun in 1819. His first version, in two parts, was done in 1798 and 1799. A second major revision, bringing the work to 13 parts, occurred in 1805 and 1806. The book is not published in any form until shortly after his death in 1850, in a 14-part version. The revisions do not just add text but remove and rearrange passages as well. Many of Wordsworth's friends read the book in manuscript during his lifetime.
 First translation of the Old English epic poem Beowulf into a modern language, Danish, Bjovulfs Drape, made by N. F. S. Grundtvig.

Works published

United Kingdom
 Alexander Balfour, Contemplation
 William Barnes, Poetical Pieces
 Bernard Barton:
 A Day in Autumn
 Poems
 William Blake, Jerusalem: The Emanation of the Giant Albion (completed; publication commenced 1804)
 Elizabeth Barrett (Browning), The Battle of Marathon
 Edward Lytton Bulwer (later "Bulwer-Lytton"), Ismael: An Oriental Tale, with Other Poems
 Robert Burns, The Songs of Robert Burns
 Thomas Chalmers, Commercial Discourses
 John Clare, Poems Descriptive of Rural Life and Scenery
 Introduction of the limerick in The History of Sixteen Wonderful Old Women
 William Combe, The Second Tour of Doctor Syntax, in Search of Consolation, published anonymously, see also The Tour of Doctor Syntax (1812), The Third Tour (1821)
 Bryan Waller Proctor, writing under the pen name "Barry Cornwall":
 Marcian Colonna, verse drama
 A Sicilian Story, with Diego de Montilla, and Other Poems
 George Croly, The Angel of the World; Sebastian; with Other Poems
 Ebenezer Elliott, Peter Faultless to his Brother Simon, and Other Poems
 Felicia Dorothea Hemans, The Sceptic

 John Abraham Heraud:
 The Legend of St. Loy, with Other Poems
 Tottenham
 William Hone:
 The Man in the Moon, published anonymously, illustrated by George Cruikshank, ironically dedicated to George Canning
 The Queen's Matrimonial Ladder, published in August, about the Bill of Pains and Penalties against Queen Caroline; illustrated by George Cruikshank
 Leigh Hunt, Amyntas, translated from Torquato Tasso, dedicated to John Keats
 John Keats, Lamia, Isabella, The Eve of St. Agnes, Hyperion, and Other Poems including "To Autumn", "Ode to a Nightingale", "Ode on a Grecian Urn", "Ode to Psyche" and "Hyperion"
 Henry Hart Milman, The Fall of Jerusalem
 Thomas Love Peacock, The Four Ages of Poetry, which sparked Shelley to write his Defence of Poetry
 Sir Walter Scott, The Poetical Works of Sir Walter Scott, in 12 volumes, first collected edition
 Percy Bysshe Shelley:
 Oedipus Tyrannus; or, Swellfoot the Tyrant, published anonymously; a burlesque on the trial of Queen Caroline
 Prometheus Unbound: A lyrical drama, includes "The Sensitive Plant", "A Vision of the Sea", "Ode to Heaven", "Ode to the West Wind", "To a Cloud", "To a Skylark", "Ode to Liberty"
 Sydney Smith, "Who Reads an American Book", a notorious review of Adam Seybert's Annals of the United States, published by the well-known critic in the Edinburgh Review; Smith wrote: "In the four quarters of the globe, who reads an American book? or goes to an American play? or looks at an American picture or statue?"; widely noticed in the United States, the review prompts many responses; criticism
 William Wordsworth:
 The Miscellaneous Poems of William Wordsworth
 The River Duddon

United States
 Maria Gowen Brooks, published anonymously "By a lover of the Fine Arts", Judith, Esther, and Other Poems, Boston: Cummings and Hilliard; the author's first book of poetry; praised by Robert Southey
 William Crafts, Sullivan's Island and Other Poems
 James Wallis Eastburn and (anonymously, as "his friend") Robert Charles Sands, Yamoyden, A Tale of the Wars of King Philip: in Six Cantos, New York: said to be "Published By James Eastburn"; very popular poem which treats Indian chief Metacomet ("King Philip") as wise and courageous, a pioneering treatment of the Romantic image of the American Indian; when Eastburn died before completing the poem, Sands finished it and had it published
 Henry Wadsworth Longfellow, "The Battle of Lovell's Pond", his first poem to appear in print, published on November 17 in the Portland, Maine, Gazette
 Robert Charles Sands, see Eastburn, above
 John Trumbull, The Poetical Works of John Trumbull ... Containing M'Fingal, a Modern Epic Poem, Revised and Corrected, with copious explanatory notes; The Progress of Dulness; and a Collection of Poems on Various Subjects, Written Before and During the Revolutionary War, two volumes, Hartford: Lincoln & Stone
 Lorenzo Charqueño, The Raven, which was so intense that it caused a man to take his own life in anguish and terror of the monstrosity that is The Raven.

Works published in other languages
 Alphonse de Lamartine, Méditations poétiques, France
 Alfred de Vigny, Le Bal, France
 Adam Mickiewicz, Ode to Youth (Oda do młodości), Poland
 Nguyễn Du, The Tale of Kiều (斷腸新聲, Đoạn Trường Tân Thanh, "A New Cry From a Broken Heart", better known as 傳翹 Truyện Kiều), Vietnamese poet writing in chữ nôm script
 Alexander Pushkin, Ruslan and Ludmila (Руслан и Людмила, Ruslan i Lyudmila), Russia
 Kondraty Ryleyev, To the Favourite, Russia
 Basílio da Gama, A declamação trágica ("A Tragic Declamation"), Brazilian poet who immigrated and published in Portugal, published posthumously (died 1795)

Births
Death years link to the corresponding "[year] in poetry" article:
 January 17 – Anne Brontë (died 1849), English (Yorkshire) novelist and poet, one of the Brontë sisters
 January 21 – Dalpatram (Kavishwar Dalpatram Dahyabhai, died 1898), Indian, Gujarati-language poet, father of poet Nanalal Dalpatram Kavi
 February 6 – Henry Howard Brownell (died 1872), American poet and historian
 March 17 – Jean Ingelow (died 1897), English poet and novelist
 April 16 – Charlotte Ann Fillebrown Jerauld (died 1845), American poet and author
 April 26 – Alice Cary (died 1871), American poet and short story writer, sister of poet Phoebe Cary
 July 5 – William John Macquorn Rankine (died 1872), Scottish engineer, physicist, mathematician and poet
 October 14 – John Harris (died 1884), English (Cornish) poet
 October 28 – John Henry Hopkins, Jr. (died 1891), American clergyman and hymnist
 November 23 (December 5 N.S.) – Afanasy Fet (died 1892), Russian lyric poet, essayist and short-story writer
 December 12 – Carolina Coronado (died 1911), Spanish Romantic poet, member of Hermandad Lírica
 Maqbool Shah Kralawari (died 1876), Indian, Kashmiri-language poet

Deaths
Birth years link to the corresponding "[year] in poetry" article:
 February – James Woodhouse (born 1735), English
 February 5 – William Drennan (born 1754), Irish
 March 20 – Eaton Stannard Barrett (born 1786), Irish satirical poet and author
 September 16 – Nguyễn Du (born 1766), Vietnamese
 September 21 – Joseph Rodman Drake (born 1795), American
 November 12 – William Hayley (born 1745), English writer

See also

 19th century in literature
 19th century in poetry
 Golden Age of Russian Poetry (1800–1850)
 List of poets
 List of years in poetry
 List of years in literature
 Poetry
 Romantic poetry
 Weimar Classicism period in Germany, commonly considered to have begun in 1788  and to have ended either in 1805, with the death of Friedrich Schiller, or 1832, with the death of Goethe

Notes

19th-century poetry

Poetry